Chilla Saroda Bangar is a census town in East Delhi District in the National Capital Territory of Delhi, India.

Demographics
 India census, Chilla Saroda Bangar had a population of 65,969. Males constitute 56% of the population and females 44%. Chilla Saroda Bangar has an average literacy rate of 70%, higher than the national average of 59.5%; with male literacy of 76% and female literacy of 62%. 16% of the population is under 6 years of age.

References

Cities and towns in East Delhi district